The Crewe–Manchester line is a railway line in North West England, running between Crewe and Manchester Piccadilly. It is a spur of the West Coast Main Line.

History
The line was built by the Manchester and Birmingham Railway Company, which diverted to Crewe in 1841 and merged in 1846 with others to form the London and North Western Railway Company. This, in turn, became part of the London Midland and Scottish Railway in 1923.

The route from Crewe to Manchester Piccadilly, including the Styal line, was the first section of the West Coast Main Line to be electrified, in 1959. The line was upgraded in the early 2000s, as part of the West Coast Main Line modernisation programme.  A full service resumed on the line in March 2007.

The line is joined at Cheadle Hulme by the West Coast spur from Stoke-on-Trent. At Stockport, it is then joined by the Mid-Cheshire line from Chester, the Hope Valley line from Sheffield, and by the Buxton line.

In April 2006, Network Rail organised its maintenance and train control operations into '26 Routes'; the Crewe–Manchester line was included in Route 20 (North West Urban).

Services
Northern Trains operates services between Crewe, Alderley Edge and Manchester Piccadilly, via Stockport and the Styal line via Manchester Airport. Also, a number of services to/from Manchester start or terminate at Wilmslow. 

Avanti West Coast operates West Coast Main Line services between London Euston, Crewe and Manchester. 

CrossCountry also operates a small number of services on the line between Manchester Piccadilly, Birmingham New Street and the South.

External links

 Website of Crewe to Manchester Community Rail Partnership

Transport in the Metropolitan Borough of Stockport
Crewe
Rail transport in Cheshire
Rail transport in Greater Manchester
Railway lines in North West England